Ahangar Mahalleh (also Romanized as Āhangar Maḩalleh) is a village in Khoshabar Rural District, in the Central District of Rezvanshahr County, Gilan Province, Iran. At the 2006 census, its population was 183, in 47 families.

References 

Populated places in Rezvanshahr County